Olney may refer to:

Places

Australia
 Olney Parish, New South Wales

England
 Olney, a town in the City of Milton Keynes UA, Buckinghamshire

United States
 Olney, Alabama
 Olney, Georgia - see List of places in Georgia (U.S. state) (I–R)
 Olney, Illinois
 Olney Township, Richland County, Illinois

 Olney, Maryland
 Olney Theatre Center
 Olney (Joppa, Maryland), a home on the National Register of Historic Places
 Olney Township, Nobles County, Minnesota
 Olney, Missouri
 Olney, Montana
 Olney, Oklahoma
 Olney, Oregon
 Olney, Philadelphia, Pennsylvania, a neighborhood
 Olney, Texas

Schools
 Olney Friends School, Barnesville, Ohio
 Olney High School, Philadelphia, Pennsylvania

Other uses
 Olney (surname)
 Olney station (disambiguation), stations of the name
 Olney Formation, in the Murray Basin, Australia

See also
 Olney Hymns, a collection of hymns written in Olney, Buckinghamshire, England
 Onley (disambiguation)
 Olneyville, Providence, Rhode Island, a neighborhood
 Justice Olney (disambiguation)